Mel Daluzyan (born 20 April 1988 in Leninakan, Armenian SSR), is a transgender Armenian weightlifter. He received the Honoured Master of Sports of Armenia title in 2006.

Biography
Mel Daluzyan started weight training in 2002 under the leadership of Artashes Nersisyan, competing in women's categories as Meline Daluzyan prior to his gender transition. His parents opposed his passion at first but later became proud of their son's achievements. He became an Armenian Champion seven times. In 2005 and 2006, Daluzyan won the Junior European Championship twice.

Daluzyan won a bronze medal at the 2006 World Weightlifting Championships. He became the first weightlifter from Armenia to win a World medal in the female category. The next year, Daluzyan won a gold medal at the 2007 European Weightlifting Championships and became the first Armenian individual to become a European Champion in weightlifting. He repeated this success at the 2008 European Weightlifting Championships, becoming a two-time European Champion. Daluzyan was set to compete at the 2008 Summer Olympics in Beijing, but he suffered an acute attack of pancreatitis two weeks before the Olympics and was forced to withdraw from the competition. He was substituted by Hripsime Khurshudyan.

In 2010, Daluzyan won a silver medal at the 2010 European Weightlifting Championships and a bronze medal at the 2010 World Weightlifting Championships. He finally made his Olympic debut at the 2012 Summer Olympics but was unable to set a total.

In May 2019, following reanalysis of his samples from the 2012 Olympics, which tested positive for dehydrochlormethyltestosterone metabolites and stanozolol metabolites, Daluzyan was disqualified from the Olympic Games.

References

External links
 

1988 births
Living people
World Weightlifting Championships medalists
Sportspeople from Gyumri
Olympic weightlifters of Armenia
Weightlifters at the 2012 Summer Olympics
Armenian female weightlifters
Armenian sportspeople in doping cases
Doping cases in weightlifting
European champions in weightlifting
European champions for Armenia
LGBT weightlifters
European Weightlifting Championships medalists